Yu Nan  (born 5 September 1978) is a Chinese actress. Born in Dalian, Yu Nan studied at the Beijing Film Academy, where she graduated in 1999.

Career
Yu Nan started acting at the age of 4, playing role of a little girl with a handkerchief tied to her dress. Later, instead of following her family's advice to study foreign languages and get a university degree, Yu enrolled at the Beijing Film Academy in 1995.

Her feature film debut in Lunar Eclipse (1999) by Wang Quan'an. Her feisty performance as a shy, retiring wife by day and a wild party animal by night won her Best Actress at the Deauville Asian Film Festival. The recognition caught the attention of French producers, who cast her in Rage (2003).

She subsequently starred in three more films with Wang Quan'an. Jingzhe (2003) earned her Best Actress accolades at the Golden Rooster Award and Paris International Film Festival in 2003; Tuya's Marriage (2006), the Golden Bear winner at the 2007 Berlin International Film Festival, won her the Best Actress prize from the Chicago International Film Festival for her portrayal of a shepherdess who seeks a new husband after her first one falls ill; and Weaving Girl (2009), which won Jury Special Grand prix and the FIPRESCI prize from the 2009 Montreal World Film Festival.

Yu Nan has also worked with other major Chinese directors, including Wang Xiaoshuai in In Love We Trust (2008), which won the Best Screenplay Silver Bear prize at the 2008 Berlin International Film Festival, Lee Yun-chan's in My DNA Says I Love You and Ning Hao, in his Chinese Western film, No Man's Land (2013).

Helped in part by her fluency in Mandarin, French, and English, Yu Nan has played in several international productions, such as the Canadian-Chinese film Diamond Dogs (2007), and the Hollywood films Speed Racer (2008) and The Expendables 2 (2012).

Known for her success in art house films, Yu also starred in commercial films. In Deadly Delicious (2008), she plays a frustrated wife who discovers her husband's extramarital affair and wants him to pay a price for his infidelity; and also starred in Design of Death (2012), playing a mute widow. Yu's most notable work in recent years include Silent Witness (2013) and Wolf Warriors (2015).

Festivals
Yu Nan has served as a jury member at several international film festivals:
Pusan International Film Festival in 2007
Chicago International Film Festival in 2008
Golden Rooster Awards in 2009
Shanghai International Film Festival in 2009
Berlin International Film Festival in 2010
Shanghai International Film Festival in 2013

Filmography

Awards

Notes and references

External links

Yu Nan at the Chinese Movie database

Actresses from Dalian
Beijing Film Academy alumni
Living people
21st-century Chinese actresses
Chinese film actresses
20th-century Chinese actresses
1978 births